The 1967–68 Soviet Cup was an association football cup competition of the Soviet Union. The winner of the competition, Torpedo Moscow qualified for the continental tournament.

Competition schedule

Preliminary stage

Group 1 (Russian Federation)

Preliminary round
 [Apr 23] 
 SPARTAK Belgorod              1-0  Dinamo Bryansk 
 TRUDOVIYE REZERVY Kursk       1-0  Iskra Smolensk

First round
 [May 11] 
 AVANGARD Kolomna              3-2  Zvezda Serpukhov 
 Granitas Klaipeda             0-0  Neman Grodno 
 KHIMIK Novomoskovsk           1-0  Trudoviye Rezervy Kursk 
 SPARTAK Mogilyov              2-0  Spartak Brest 
 SPARTAK Ryazan                2-0  Spartak Belgorod 
 ZNAMYA Noginsk                1-0  Spartak Tambov 
 Znamya Truda Orekhovo-Zuyevo  0-0  Spartak Oryol 
 ZVEJNIEKS Liepaja             1-0  Dvina Vitebsk

First round replays
 GRANITAS Klaipeda             3-0  Neman Grodno 
 ZNAMYA TRUDA Orekhovo-Zuyevo  3-1  Spartak Oryol

Quarterfinals
 [Jun 18] 
 AVANGARD Kolomna              1-0  Znamya Noginsk 
 SPARTAK Mogilyov              2-1  Spartak Ryazan              [aet] 
 ZNAMYA TRUDA Orekhovo-Zuyevo  4-1  Khimik Novomoskovsk 
 Zvejnieks Liepaja             0-1  GRANITAS Klaipeda

Semifinals
 Granitas Klaipeda             0-1  SPARTAK Mogilyov 
 Znamya Truda Orekhovo-Zuyevo  0-1  AVANGARD Kolomna

Final
 SPARTAK Mogilyov              4-0  Avangard Kolomna

Group 2 (Russian Federation)

Preliminary round
 KOVROVETS Kovrov              2-1  Sever Murmansk 
 TORPEDO Lyubertsy             1-0  Traktor Vladimir 
 VOLGA Ulyanovsk               1-0  Energiya Cheboksary

First round
 DINAMO Vologda                1-0  Onezhets Petrozavodsk 
 METALLURG Cherepovets         2-1  Bolshevik Leningrad 
 METALLURG Lipetsk             2-1  Chaika Zelyonodolsk 
 SATURN Rybinsk                2-0  Kovrovets Kovrov 
 SPARTAK Saransk               3-1  Spartak Kostroma 
 TORPEDO Lyubertsy             2-1  Mashinostroitel Balashikha 
 Torpedo Pavlovo               1-1  Khimik Dzerzhinsk 
 VOLGA Ulyanovsk               1-0  Torpedo Podolsk

First round replays
 Torpedo Pavlovo               0-2  KHIMIK Dzerzhinsk

Quarterfinals
 Dinamo Vologda                0-1  METALLURG Lipetsk 
 SATURN Rybinsk                2-1  Metallurg Cherepovets 
 TORPEDO Lyubertsy             1-0  Spartak Saransk 
 VOLGA Ulyanovsk               1-0  Khimik Dzerzhinsk

Semifinals
 METALLURG Lipetsk             2-0  Saturn Rybinsk 
 VOLGA Ulyanovsk               1-0  Torpedo Lyubertsy

Final
 METALLURG Lipetsk             3-1  Volga Ulyanovsk

Group 3 (Russian Federation)

Preliminary round
 POLAD Sumgait                 2-1  Textilshchik Mingechaur 
 UROZHAI Pavlovskaya           1-0  Urozhai Svetlograd 
 VOLGAR Astrakhan              4-0  Khimik Balakovo

First round
 ENERGIYA Novocherkassk        3-0  Kalitva Belaya Kalitva 
 ENERGIYA Volzhskiy            1-0  Trud Engels 
 PROGRESS Kamensk              3-0  Uralan Elista 
 SHAKHTYOR Shakhty             3-2  Volgar Astrakhan 
 TORPEDO Armavir               3-2  Polad Sumgait 
 TORPEDO Taganrog              2-0  Urozhai Pavlovskaya 
 TRUD Togliatti                2-1  Khimmashevets Penza 
 TYAZHMASH Syzran              1-0  Metallurg Kuibyshev

Quarterfinals
 ENERGIYA Novocherkassk        4-1  Torpedo Armavir 
 SHAKHTYOR Shakhty             1-0  Progress Kamensk 
 Trud Togliatti                3-4  ENERGIYA Volzhskiy 
 TYAZHMASH Syzran              2-1  Torpedo Taganrog

Semifinals
 Energiya Novocherkassk        2-2  Shakhtyor Shakhty 
 Energiya Volzhskiy            1-2  TYAZHMASH Syzran

Semifinals replays
 ENERGIYA Novocherkassk        3-2  Shakhtyor Shakhty

Final
 ENERGIYA Novocherkassk        2-1  TyazhMash Syzran

Group 4 (Russian Federation)

Preliminary round
 DINAMO Sukhumi                3-2  Shukura Kobuleti 
 Guria Lanchkhuti              0-0  Kolkhida Poti 
 LERNAGORTS Kafan              2-1  Sevan Oktemberyan 
 LORI Kirovakan                1-0  Araks Yerevan

Preliminary round replays
 GURIA Lanchkhuti              3-2  Kolkhida Poti

First round
 CEMENT Novorossiysk           3-1  Dinamo Makhachkala 
 Dinamo Sukhumi                2-4  GURIA Lanchkhuti 
 INGURI Zugdidi                1-0  Magaroeli Chiatura 
 Lernagorts Kafan              3-3  Alazani Gurjaani 
 LORI Kirovakan                3-2  Dila Gori 
 METALLURG Rustavi             2-0  Mashinostroitel Pyatigorsk 
 SPARTAK Kislovodsk            2-0  Urozhai Maykop 
 UROZHAI Krymsk                4-0  Urozhai Derbent

First round replays
 LERNAGORTS Kafan              4-3  Alazani Gurjaani

Quarterfinals
 Lernagorts Kafan              3-3  Inguri Zugdidi 
 METALLURG Rustavi             1-0  Guria Lanchkhuti 
 SPARTAK Kislovodsk            w/o  Lori Kirovakan 
 UROZHAI Krymsk                2-1  Cement Novorossiysk

Quarterfinals replays
 LERNAGORTS Kafan              1-0  Inguri Zugdidi

Semifinals
 Metallurg Rustavi             0-2  UROZHAI Krymsk 
 SPARTAK Kislovodsk            2-0  Lernagorts Kafan

Final
 Urozhai Krymsk                0-1  SPARTAK Kislovodsk

Group 5 (Russian Federation)

Preliminary round
 KALININETS Sverdlovsk         3-0  Metallurg Zlatoust 
 LOKOMOTIV Orenburg            4-1  Torpedo Miass 
 METALLURG Magnitogorsk        2-1  Neftyanik Bugulma

First round
 AVTOMOBILIST Kustanay         2-1  Khimik Salavat 
 DINAMO Kirov                  4-1  Neftyanik Tyumen 
 KAUCHUK Sterlitamak           w/o  Aktyubinets Aktyubinsk 
 KHIMIK Berezniki              2-0  Kalininets Sverdlovsk 
 METALLURG Magnitogorsk        1-0  Zauralets Kurgan 
 SPARTAK Yoshkar-Ola           4-0  Neftyanik Oktyabrskiy 
 URALETS Nizhniy Tagil         1-0  Lokomotiv Orenburg 
 ZENIT Izhevsk                 2-1  Burovik Almetyevsk

Quarterfinals
 Avtomobilist Kustanay         0-2  METALLURG Magnitogorsk 
 DINAMO Kirov                  3-2  Spartak Yoshkar-Ola         [aet] 
 Uralets Nizhniy Tagil         1-2  KAUCHUK Sterlitamak 
 ZENIT Izhevsk                 2-0  Khimik Berezniki

Semifinals
 Dinamo Kirov                  0-1  ZENIT Izhevsk 
 KAUCHUK Sterlitamak           1-0  Metallurg Magnitogorsk

Final
 ZENIT Izhevsk                 5-0  Kauchuk Sterlitamak

Group 6 (Russian Federation)

Preliminary round
 CEMENTNIK Semipalatinsk       2-1  Shakhtyor Kiselyovsk        [aet] 
 PROGRESS Biysk                2-0  Shakhtyor Prokopyevsk

First round
 AVANGARD Komsomolsk-na-Amure  2-1  Rybak Nakhodka 
 Lokomotiv Krasnoyarsk         2-2  Progress Biysk 
 METALLURG Novokuznetsk        2-0  Irtysh Pavlodar 
 OKEAN Vladivostok             1-0  Amur Blagoveshchensk 
 SELENGA Ulan-Ude              1-0  Pursei Bratsk 
 SKA Chita                     3-2  Angara Irkutsk              [aet] 
 START Angarsk                 2-0  Neftyanik Omsk 
 Torpedo Rubtsovsk             0-1  CEMENTNIK Semipalatinsk

First round replays
 LOKOMOTIV Krasnoyarsk         2-0  Progress Biysk

Quarterfinals
 CEMENTNIK Semipalatinsk       1-0  Metallurg Novokuznetsk      [aet] 
 LOKOMOTIV Krasnoyarsk         2-1  Start Angarsk 
 OKEAN Vladivostok             1-0  Avangard Komsomolsk-na-Amure 
 SELENGA Ulan-Ude              3-0  SKA Chita

Semifinals
 CEMENTNIK Semipalatinsk       2-0  Lokomotiv Krasnoyarsk 
 OKEAN Vladivostok             2-1  Selenga Ulan-Ude

Final
 CEMENTNIK Semipalatinsk       5-2  Okean Vladivostok

Group Zakarpattia (Ukraine)

First round
 AVANGARD Makeyevka            0-0  Shakhter Krasnograd        [pen] 
 AVANGARD Ternopol             3-0  Verkhovina Uzhgorod 
 BUKOVINA Chernovtsy           2-1  Shakhter Novovolynsk 
 DINAMO Khmelnitskiy           2-1  Neftyanik Drogobych 
 ENERGIA Novaya Kakhovka       1-0  Goryn Rovno 
 KARPATY Mukachevo             1-0  Start Dzerzhinsk 
 SHAKHTER Kadiyevka            2-0  Dnepr Cherkassy 
 SPARTAK Ivano-Frankovsk       6-4  Torpedo Lutsk

Quarterfinals
 DINAMO Khmelnitskiy           2-0  Spartak Ivano-Frankovsk 
 ENERGIYA Novaya Kakhovka      1-0  Avangard Makeyevka 
 KARPATY Mukachevo             2-1  Bukovina Chernovtsy 
 SHAKHTYOR Kadiyevka           0-0  Avangard Ternopol           [pen]

Semifinals
 DINAMO Khmelnitskiy           2-0  Shakhtyor Kadiyevka 
 KARPATY Mukachevo             0-0  Energiya Novaya Kakhovka    [pen]

Final
 Karpaty Mukachevo             0-1  DINAMO Khmelnitskiy

Group Crimea (Ukraine)

First round
 AVANGARD Kerch                1-0  Torpedo Berdyansk 
 KOLOS Akimovka                2-1  Progress Berdichev 
 PROMETHEUS Dneprodzerzhinsk   1-0  Lokomotiv Donetsk 
 SITALL Konstantinovka         2-0  Trubnik Nikopol 
 TORPEDO Kharkov               1-0  Shakhtyor Sverdlovsk

Quarterfinals
 Avangard Kerch                1-2  PROMETHEUS Dneprodzerzhinsk 
 DESNA Chernigov               0-0  Avangard Rovenki            [pen 9-8] 
 KOLOS Akimovka                2-1  Sitall Konstantinovka 
 SPARTAK Sumy                  1-0  Torpedo Kharkov

Semifinals
 DESNA Chernigov               3-1  Prometheus Dneprodzerzhinsk 
 SPARTAK Sumy                  2-1  Kolos Akimovka

Final
 SPARTAK Sumy                  1-0  Desna Chernigov

Group Asia

Subgroup 1
 1.Sverdlovets Tashkent Region    2   1  0  1  2-2   2   
 -----------------------------------------------------
 2.Tselinnik Yangiyer             2   1  0  1  3-3   2   
 3.Metallurg Almalyk              2   1  0  1  3-3   2   

 Cross-Table:
                    1   2   3        
 1.Sverdlovets      xxx 2-0 0-2  
 2.Tselinnik        0-2 xxx 3-1  
 3.Metallurg        2-0 1-3 xxx

Subgroup 2
 1.Irrigator Charjou              3   2  1  0  6-2   5   
 -----------------------------------------------------
 2.Samarkand                      3   1  1  1  4-4   3   
 3.Fakel Buhara                   3   0  2  1  2-3   2  
 4.Kara-Kum Mary                  3   0  2  1  3-6   2   

 Cross-Table:
                    1   2   3   4       
 1.Irrigator        xxx 2-1 0-0 4-1   
 2.Samarkand        1-2 xxx 2-1 1-1  
 3.Fakel            0-0 1-2 xxx 1-1  
 4.Kara-Kum         1-4 1-1 1-1 xxx

Subgroup 3
 1.Andizhan                       2   1  1  0  3-1   3   
 -----------------------------------------------------
 2.Pahtaaral Gulustan             2   0  2  0  2-2   2   
 3.Akkurgan Tashkent Region       2   0  1  1  1-3   1   

 Cross-Table:
                    1   2   3        
 1.Andizhan         xxx 1-1 2-0  
 2.Pahtaaral        1-1 xxx 1-1  
 3.Akkurgan         0-2 1-1 xxx

Subgroup 4
 1.Ok Oltyn Andizhan Region       2   1  1  0  4-1   3   
 -----------------------------------------------------
 2.Alay Osh                       2   0  2  0  2-2   2   
 3.Pakhtakor Kurgan-Tyube          2   0  1  1  3-6   1   

 Cross-Table:
                    1   2   3        
 1.Ok Oltyn         xxx 0-0 4-1  
 2.Alay             0-0 xxx 2-2  
 3.Pakhtakor         1-4 2-2 xxx

Semifinals
 Andizhan                      1-4  SVERDLOVETS Tashkent Region 
 IRRIGATOR Charjou             2-0  Ok Oltyn Andizhan Region

Final
 SVERDLOVETS Tashkent Region   2-1  Irrigator Charjou           [aet]

Final stage

First round
 [Apr 2] 
 TEXTILSHCHIK Ivanovo          1-0  Energiya Novocherkassk 
   [Y.Pyanov 8] 
 [Apr 3] 
 KARPATY Lvov                  1-0  Spartak Mogilyov 
 LUCH Vladivostok              2-1  SKA Khabarovsk 
   [V.Akimov, A.Kandalintsev – V.Ivkin] 
 Metallurg Chimkent            2-2  SKA Chita 
 METALLURG Zaporozhye          3-0  Dnepr Dnepropetrovsk 
   [V.Chaplygin-2, B.Baluyev] 
 TEMP Barnaul                  1-0  Vostok Ust-Kamenogorsk 
   [B.Dolgov] 
 [Apr 4] 
 AVTOMOBILIST Zhitomir         2-0  Daugava Riga 
 Baltika Kaliningrad           0-0  SKA Odessa 
 CEMENTNIK Semipalatinsk       3-2  Sverdlovets Tashkent Region [aet] 
 DINAMO Khmelnitskiy           1-0  Metallurg Tula 
 DINAMO Stavropol              2-1  Lokomotiv Kherson 
   [Zhuravlyov, Solovyov – Drovetskiy] 
 DNEPR Kremenchug              2-1  Spartak Nalchik             [aet] 
 Energetik Dushanbe            0-1  SHAKHTYOR Karaganda 
 IRTYSH Omsk                   1-0  Aeroflot Irkutsk 
 KHIMIK Severodonetsk          5-1  Volga Kalinin 
 Krivbass Krivoi Rog           2-3  SKA Kiev 
   [Y.Sprikut, V.Gladkikh - ?] 
 KUBAN Krasnodar               3-0  Zvezda Kirovograd 
 KUZBASS Kemerovo              2-1  SKA Novosibirsk             [aet] 
   [N.Golikov, N.Chernomyrdin – B.Smirnov] 
 LOKOMOTIV Kaluga              1-0  Dinamo Tallinn 
 LOKOMOTIV Tbilisi             1-0  Volga Ulyanovsk 
 Lokomotiv Vinnitsa            2-2  Dinamo Leningrad 
 METALLURG Lipetsk             2-1  Tavria Simferopol           [aet] 
 MOLDOVA Kishinev              2-0  Neman Grodno 
   [I.Nadein 80, A.Teslev 88] 
 NARZAN Kislovodsk             2-0  Meshakhte Tkibuli 
 PAMIR Leninabad               1-0  Rassvet Krasnoyarsk 
 POLITOTDEL Tashkent Region    2-0  Zarafshan Navoi 
 ROSTSELMASH Rostov-na-Donu    1-0  Metallurg Kuibyshev 
   [Yermakov] 
 SHIRAK Leninakan              6-1  Polad Sumgait 
 SKA Lvov                      1-0  Spartak Gomel               [aet] 
   [V.Pinkovskiy 102] 
 SKCF Sevastopol               1-0  Avangard Zholtyye Vody      [aet] 
 Sokol Saratov                 1-1  Shinnik Yaroslavl 
   [Shpitalny – G.Shilin] 
 SPARTAK Orjonikidze           4-0  Lokomotiv Chelyabinsk 
   [Y.Abayev-2, Y.Savidi, N.Papelishvili] 
 STROITEL Ufa                  1-0  Zenit Izhevsk 
   [V.Starkov] 
 SUDOSTROITEL Nikolayev        2-1  Trud Voronezh 
   [Petrov 12, Bildyuk 64 – Proskurin 7] 
 TEREK Grozny                  2-1  Spartak Yoshkar-Ola 
 TOMLES Tomsk                  w/o  Alga Frunze 
 TRAKTOR Volgograd             1-0  Zvezda Perm                 [aet] 
 URALMASH Sverdlovsk           1-0  Rubin Kazan 
 Volga Gorkiy                  1-1  Volgar Astrakhan

First round replays
 [Apr 4] 
 Metallurg Chimkent            1-2  SKA Chita 
   [? – O.Semyonov, V.Yeryomin] 
 [Apr 5] 
 BALTIKA Kaliningrad           1-0  SKA Odessa 
   [V.Knyazev 3] 
 Lokomotiv Vinnitsa            1-2  DINAMO Leningrad            [aet] 
 SOKOL Saratov                 1-0  Shinnik Yaroslavl 
   [Zarubin] 
 VOLGA Gorkiy                  3-0  Volgar Astrakhan

Second round
 [Apr 7] 
 Cementnik Semipalatinsk       0-1  STROITEL Ashkhabad          [aet] 
 KUZBASS Kemerovo              1-0  SKA Chita 
   [V.Ryashin] 
 NEFTYANIK Fergana             1-0  Temp Barnaul                [aet] 
 PAMIR Leninabad               1-0  Irtysh Omsk 
 [Apr 8] 
 POLITOTDEL Tashkent Region    1-0  Luch Vladivostok 
 Shakhtyor Karaganda           1-2  TOMLES Tomsk 
   [? – V.Mavrov (S) og, A.Makushin] 
 [Apr 19] 
 Avtomobilist Zhitomir         0-0  SelStroi Poltava 
 DINAMO Batumi                 2-1  Volga Gorkiy                [aet] 
 DINAMO Leningrad              6-2  Dinamo Khmelnitskiy 
 Karpaty Lvov                  0-1  SKA Kiev                    [aet] 
 KHIMIK Severodonetsk          1-0  Baltika Kaliningrad 
 Lokomotiv Kaluga              1-2  MOLDOVA Kishinev 
 METALLIST Kharkov             2-0  Metallurg Zaporozhye 
   [A.Kafaji, Y.Nemirovskiy] 
 METALLURG Lipetsk             2-1  Dnepr Kremenchug 
 Metallurg Magnitogorsk        0-0  Shirak Leninakan 
 Narzan Kislovodsk             2-2  Dinamo Makhachkala 
 SKCF Sevastopol               0-0  Kuban Krasnodar 
 SOKOL Saratov                 3-0  RostSelMash Rostov-na-Donu 
   [Chernyshkov-2, Filipenko] 
 Spartak Sumy                  1-1  Dinamo Stavropol 
 STROITEL Ufa                  1-0  Terek Grozny 
   [N.Filatov] 
 SUDOSTROITEL Nikolayev        1-0  Textilshchik Ivanovo 
   [I.Petrov 90] 
 TRAKTOR Volgograd             2-0  Lokomotiv Tbilisi 
 URALMASH Sverdlovsk           3-0  Spartak Orjonikidze 
 ŽALGIRIS Vilnius              2-0  SKA Lvov

Second round replays
 AVTOMOBILIST Zhitomir         1-0  SelStroi Poltava            [aet] 
   [Matveyev] 
 METALLURG Magnitogorsk        1-0  Shirak Leninakan 
 NARZAN Kislovodsk             1-0  Dinamo Makhachkala          [aet] 
 SKCF Sevastopol               1-2  KUBAN Krasnodar             [aet] 
 SPARTAK Sumy                  2-1  Dinamo Stavropol            [aet] 
   [? – Moiseyev]

Third round
 [Apr 21] 
 KUZBASS Kemerovo              4-2  TomLes Tomsk                [aet] 
   [V.Poluyanov-2, A.Zavyalkin, V.Cheremnov – I.Ishchenko-2] 
 NEFTYANIK Fergana             1-0  Politotdel Tashkent Region 
 STROITEL Ashkhabad            2-1  Pamir Leninabad 
 [May 20] 
 Avtomobilist Zhitomir         2-3  DINAMO Leningrad 
 Metallist Kharkov             0-1  KUBAN Krasnodar             [aet] 
 Metallurg Magnitogorsk        1-2  URALMASH Sverdlovsk 
 MOLDOVA Kishinev              2-1  Khimik Severodonetsk        [aet] 
 SKA Kiev                      3-1  Žalgiris Vilnius 
 SPARTAK Sumy                  2-0  Metallurg Lipetsk 
 STROITEL Ufa                  w/o  Narzan Kislovodsk 
 Sudostroitel Nikolayev        1-2  SOKOL Saratov 
   [I.Petrov 88 – Zarubin 40, Demidov 90] 
 Traktor Volgograd             0-1  DINAMO Batumi

Fourth round
 [Jun 16] 
 SOKOL Saratov                 2-1  Ararat Yerevan 
   [Filipenko-2 – Sergei Melkumov] 
 [Jun 27] 
 Dinamo Batumi                 0-2  PAHTAKOR Tashkent 
   [Gennadiy Krasnitskiy-2] 
 KUZBASS Kemerovo              3-0  Zenit Leningrad 
   [N.Golikov 38, A.Lavrushchenko 60, V.Cheremnov 75] 
 Moldova Kishinev              1-2  DINAMO Minsk                [aet] 
   [A.Teslev ? – Anatoliy Vasilyev 107, Mikhail Mustygin 108] 
 SKA Kiev                      1-0  Dinamo Kirovabad 
   [Bogodelov 78] 
 Stroitel Ufa                  1-3  NEFTCHI Baku 
   [B.Sokolovskiy – Valeriy Gajiyev, Anatoliy Banishevskiy, Eduard Markarov] 
 URALMASH Sverdlovsk           3-0  Chernomorets Odessa 
   [G.Yepishin 27, V.Borodin 39, A.Zhos 43] 
 [Jun 28] 
 CSKA Moskva                   4-1  Lokomotiv Moskva 
   [Vladimir Fedotov 33, Vladimir Dudarenko 52, 75, Vladimir Polikarpov 60 – Boris Kokh 62] 
 DINAMO Kiev                   3-0  Spartak Moskva 
   [Vitaliy Khmelnitskiy 22, Yozhef Sabo 62, 86] 
 Dinamo Leningrad              1-4  SHAKHTYOR Donetsk 
   [O.Sakharov – Stanislav Yevseyenko-2, Valeriy Lobanovskiy, Anatoliy Ogirchuk] 
 DINAMO Tbilisi                3-0  SKA Rostov-na-Donu 
   [Georgiy Gavasheli 15, Slava Metreveli ?, Kakhi Asatiani 80] 
 Kuban Krasnodar               0-3  DINAMO Moskva 
   [Vadim Ivanov 40, Yuriy Avrutskiy 60, Vladimir Kozlov 87] 
 Neftyanik Fergana             0-2  TORPEDO Moskva 
   [David Pais, Eduard Streltsov] 
 Spartak Sumy                  1-3  KAYRAT Alma-Ata 
   [Kislyakov – Oleg Dolmatov, Valentin Dyshlenko, Kislenko] 
 STROITEL Ashkhabad            3-0  Krylya Sovetov Kuibyshev 
   [Karnakhin-2, V.Kazakov] 
 ZARYA Lugansk                 3-1  Torpedo Kutaisi 
   [Vladislav Prodanets 47, 79, Nikolai Pinchuk 61 – Otari Gadelia 84]

Fifth round
 [Jul 23] 
 Dinamo Minsk                  0-2  ZARYA Lugansk 
   [Nikolai Litvinov 29, Yuriy Meleshko 72] 
 KAYRAT Alma-Ata               2-1  Dinamo Moskva 
   [Viktor Abgolts 26, Oleg Volokh 88 – Vladimir Larin 82] 
 NEFTCHI Baku                  3-0  Stroitel Ashkhabad 
   [Eduard Markarov 26, 61, Yuriy Stekolnikov 31] 
 PAHTAKOR Tashkent             1-0  Sokol Saratov 
   [G.Zhilenko 73] 
 SHAKHTYOR Donetsk             1-0  Dinamo Kiev 
   [Valeriy Yaremchenko 4] 
 SKA Kiev                      5-2  Kuzbass Kemerovo 
   [M.Stuller 33, 60, B.Verigin 37, P.Bogodelov 67, V.Pestrikov 75 – V.Poluyanov 26, 43] 
 Torpedo Moskva                2-2  CSKA Moskva 
   [Eduard Streltsov 37, Alexandr Lenyov 58 – Pavel Adamov 62, Vladimir Polikarpov 83] 
 URALMASH Sverdlovsk           1-0  Dinamo Tbilisi 
   [G.Yepishin 56]

Fifth round replay
 [Jul 24] 
 TORPEDO Moskva                2-1  CSKA Moskva 
   [Gennadiy Shalimov 5, Eduard Streltsov 58 – Vladimir Fedotov 11]

Quarterfinals
 [Aug 6] 
 Kayrat Alma-Ata         2-3  NEFTCHI Baku 
   [Sergei Kvochkin, Viktor Abgolts – Anatoliy Banishevskiy-2, Valentin Dyshlenko (K) og] 
 SHAKHTYOR Donetsk       1-0  SKA Kiev 
   [Viktor Tlyarugov 80] 
 TORPEDO Moskva          3-1  UralMash Sverdlovsk 
   [Mikhail Gershkovich 22, Vladimir Mikhailov 28, Grigoriy Yanets 30 – V.Borodin ?] 
 Zarya Lugansk           1-2  PAHTAKOR Tashkent 
   [Nikolai Pinchuk 88 – Berador Abduraimov 60, Tulyagan Isakov 73]

Semifinals
 [Aug 26] 
 Neftchi Baku            0-2  TORPEDO Moskva 
   [Alexandr Lenyov 21, Adil Babayev (N) 61 og] 
 PAHTAKOR Tashkent       3-1  Shakhtyor Donetsk 
   [Berador Abduraimov 1, 34, Bohadyr Ibragimov 53 – Yuriy Gubich 88]

Final

External links
 Complete calendar. helmsoccer.narod.ru
 1968 Soviet Cup. Footballfacts.ru
 1968 Soviet football season. RSSSF

Soviet Cup seasons
Cup
Cup
Soviet Cup